City Hospital (also known as Island Hospital or Charity Hospital) was an historic hospital on Roosevelt Island, Manhattan in New York City.

History 

Originally named Penitentiary Hospital and located on what was then known as Blackwell's Island, the first hospital was built in 1832 to serve the prisoners housed at Blackwell's Penitentiary. After the hospital was destroyed by a fire in 1858, architect James Renwick, Jr. designed a new building to be called City Hospital, on which prisoners completed construction in 1861. It served both inmates and New York City's poorer population. In 1870, the hospital was renamed Charity Hospital and a medical superintendent was hired after the quality of care was criticized.

In 1877, Charity Hospital opened a school of nursing, the fourth such training institution in the United States. The program of education for nurses encompassed two to three years of training in the care of patients and general hospital cleanliness. At Charity Hospital, nurses treated patients, assisted surgeons, weighed and cared for newborns, and took cooking classes. In 1916, Dr. Orrin Sage Wightman, an internist at the hospital, took a series of photographs of student nurses, which are housed at the New-York Historical Society.

The city changed the name of the island to Welfare Island in 1921 to reflect the mission of the institutions located there.

Abandonment

The prison closed in 1935, and the hospital was closed in 1957, when operations for Charity Hospital and Smallpox Hospital were moved to Elmhurst Hospital Center in Queens. The building, designed in the Second Empire style, was added to the National Register of Historic Places in 1972. The next year, Welfare Island was renamed Roosevelt Island in honor of Franklin D. Roosevelt. 

By 1986, the hospital was being considered for demolition because its condition had deteriorated so much. The hospital was demolished in 1994. Stones salvaged from the structure were used in paths in the Franklin D. Roosevelt Four Freedoms Park, which was constructed on the southern tip of the island.

References

Hospital buildings completed in 1832
Hospitals established in 1832
Hospital buildings completed in 1861
Defunct hospitals in Manhattan
Buildings and structures on the National Register of Historic Places in Manhattan
Government buildings completed in 1861
Infrastructure completed in 1861
Roosevelt Island
1832 establishments in New York (state)
James Renwick Jr. buildings
Second Empire architecture in New York City
1861 establishments in New York (state)
Buildings and structures demolished in 1994
Demolished buildings and structures in Manhattan